Main Bolagh (also Romanized as Mā’īn Bolāgh) is a village in Saruq Rural District, Takht-e Soleyman District, Takab County, West Azerbaijan Province, Iran. At the 2006 census, its population was 392, in 77 families.

References 

Populated places in Takab County